Antonio Fuentes Trillanes IV (born August 6, 1971) is a retired Philippine naval officer who also served as a senator of the Philippines from 2007 to 2019. He is known for his involvement in the Oakwood mutiny of 2003 and the Manila Peninsula siege in 2007 in protest against the Arroyo administration, and as a vocal critic of the Duterte administration.

He previously ran as a candidate for vice president in the 2016 Philippine presidential elections. After his term as senator, he became a full-time lecturer, teaching public policy at UP National College of Public Administration and Governance of University of the Philippines Diliman and at Ateneo de Manila University.

Early life
Trillanes was born and raised in Caloocan to Navy Capt. Antonio Floranza Trillanes III of Ligao, Albay and Estelita Diaz Fuentes of Capiz. He has four siblings.

Education
Trillanes initially attended the De La Salle University for a degree in Electronics and Communications Engineering in 1987. However, in 1991, he decided to enter the Philippine Military Academy, where he graduated cum laude in 1995 with a Naval Systems Engineering degree.

He received his masteral degree in Public Administration from the University of the Philippines Diliman.

Military career

Trillanes is a recipient of an assortment of merit medals, campaign ribbons and badges totaling 23.

Oakwood Mutiny 

In 2003, Trillanes, then a Lieutenant Senior Grade, along with Army Capt. Gerardo Gambala, led 321 junior officers and enlisted men of the Armed Forces in a mutiny against the Arroyo administration. Calling themselves the "Bagong Katipuneros" but tagged by the press as the Magdalo group, the soldiers occupied the Oakwood Premier Ayala Center (now Ascott Makati), a serviced apartment tower in Makati, to protest the alleged corruption of the administration.

The mutiny was unsuccessful, lasting only 18 hours. Trillanes and his men were charged in a general court martial. He was detained for nearly seven and a half years.

Manila Peninsula siege

On November 29, 2007, Trillanes, Brigadier Gen. Danilo Lim, and 25 others charged in relation to the Oakwood mutiny, walked out of their trial and marched in Makati towards the Manila Peninsula Hotel. They seized control of the hotel, which is just a few blocks away from the location of their earlier mutiny. There, they called for the ousting of Gloria Macapagal-Arroyo. They were joined by former vice president Teofisto Guingona Jr., who called for a "new EDSA."

The attempted coup was over by 5:10 p.m., however, when government soldiers broke through the hotel. Trillanes and Lim surrendered, reasoning their doing so "to avoid loss of lives." The siege lasted for six hours.

Trillanes and his cohorts were arrested by the Philippine National Police and were sent to Camp Bagong Diwa. Among the arrested were journalists from various networks. Defense secretary Gilberto Teodoro defended the journalists' arrests, claiming the officers "didn't know the journalists and may have mistook them as renegade soldiers." The journalists were released soon after.

Political career

Senate

First term (2007-2013) 

Trillanes filed his candidacy for the 2007 senatorial elections as an independent candidate. Later, however, he accepted an invitation from the Genuine Opposition as one of its guest candidates fielded against the Arroyo administration's bets. His bid was successful, and he was proclaimed senator-elect by the COMELEC. He was the youngest senator to hold the office since Benigno Aquino, Jr., a record he would later share with Bam Aquino in 2013.

On July 23, 2007, Trillanes filed a motion with the Makati RTC that would allow him to fulfill his senatorial duties while under detention, and allow him to attend the SONA. His plea was denied. In response, former UP president Francisco Nemenzo Jr. and Teofisto Guingona launched the "Let Trillanes Serve Movement."

On October 17, 2007, the Supreme Court, in an en banc resolution, directed the Armed Forces and Makati RTC Judge Oscar Pimentel to comment within 10 days on Trillanes' petition. However, these requests were later overshadowed by Trillanes' involvement in the Manila Peninsula siege.

On December 20, 2010, Trillanes was temporarily released. He was later granted amnesty by President Benigno Aquino III.

Second term (2013-2019)
Trillanes ran again for a second term, filing his candidacy for the 2013 senatorial elections. Running under the Nacionalista Party, he again won, garnering over 14 million votes.
Trillanes was one of the most productive senators in the 17th Congress, producing 232 bills in 2018, despite being only present for 52 session days.

2016 vice presidential campaign

Trillanes declared his intention to run for higher office as vice president in the 2016 national elections. Running with no president, he endorsed the presidential bid of Grace Poe.

His campaign was marked by a controversy involving the several paid negative campaign ads against Rodrigo Duterte, including a video showing him dropping the finger. Described as "black propaganda," Duterte's running mate Alan Peter Cayetano filed a petition to the Taguig RTC to stop the airing of the ads for 72 hours. The petition was granted by court using a TRO.

Trillanes eventually lost the heavily contested race to Leni Robredo, after garnering more than 800,000 votes.

2022 Senate bid 
On October 8, 2022, Trillanes filed his candidacy for senator in the 2022 senatorial election running under the Liberal Party. Trillanes failed his comeback bid to the Senate after he placed 21st in the official results.

Criticism and controversies

Rivalry against Duterte
Before the 2016 election, he alleged that former Davao City Mayor and incumbent president Rodrigo Duterte had an account in the Julia Vargas branch of BPI (allegedly Php 2.2 B) according to him. Duterte, later on, confirmed the existence of the alleged bank accounts, but he never signed a waiver to dispute the alleged billions of pesos contained therein.

Likewise President Duterte, alleges that Trillanes closed his accounts in DBS Bank days before going to Singapore and then showed that there were no such accounts. This became a source of polemics in social media such as Twitter and Facebook. However, DBS Bank disputed this and clarified that account closures cannot be done online.

Since then, Trillanes has become a rival of Duterte. Duterte's common law wife, Honeylet Avancena, defended Duterte against Trillanes' controversies.

In an attempt to silence Trillanes's exposés against President Duterte, his administration has filed and revived at least 14 cases against Trillanes. On July 19, 2019, the PNP–Criminal Investigation and Detection Group (CIDG) filed charges against Trillanes and other members of the opposition for "sedition, cyber libel, libel, estafa, harboring a criminal, and obstruction of justice". On February 10, 2020, Trillanes and 10 others were indicted for "conspiracy to commit sedition" over an alleged ouster plot against President Rodrigo Duterte.

Revocation of amnesty by President Duterte
On August 31, 2018, President Rodrigo Duterte signed Proclamation No. 572, revoking Trillanes's amnesty. Duterte ordered the Department of Justice and the Armed Forces of the Philippines (AFP) to review all criminal cases in relation to the 2003 Oakwood mutiny and 2007 Peninsula siege. Shortly after that, Trillanes told to the reporters that he would not evade the case and he also told to Duterte that he is not afraid of him. The amnesty (Proclamation No 50) was granted by then-President Benigno Aquino III and later issued Proclamation 75 superseding Proclamation no. 50 back in 2010.

On September 7, the DOJ filed the application for an arrest and hold departure against Trillanes and it was signed at Makati Regional Trial Court Branch 150 by Acting Prosecutor General Richard Fadullon as "very urgent".

Opposition politicians expressed condemnation over the revocation of the amnesty: Magdalo Representative Gary Alejano, who also led the mutiny with Trillanes, calls it "political persecution" of Duterte's critics and he also slammed Duterte for what was called a "clear act of revenge" against Trillanes. Akbayan Representative Tom Villarin called the revocation "highly preposterous" and "clearly a political vendetta." On September 7, former Solicitor General Florin Hilbay said in an interview that the decision against Trillanes is similar to the case of Senator Leila de Lima, who was detained for allegedly violating the drug trafficking law almost a year and a half ago. Supporters of Trillanes gathered outside the Senate and held a vigil. Duterte severely lambasted Trillanes by describing the latter as "corrupt" and accused him of "abandoning" the military for his personal interests.

On October 22, The Regional Trial Court in Makati denied the government's petition to have Trillanes arrested, saying the coup d'état case against the senator was already dismissed on September 21, 2011, and that the dismissal was "final and executory".

Personal life
Trillanes is married to Arlene G. Orejana, a PMA graduate. They have had three children, one of whom died just 21 days after birth.

In February 2020, Trillanes launched his vlog TRx: Trillanes Explains, where he discusses pressing issues and releases exposés coursed through his social media accounts. He also revealed on his vlog that he was diagnosed with COVID-19 in August 2020; he was able to recover from the disease.

References

External links
 Senator Antonio "Sonny" F. Trillanes IV – Senate of the Philippines
 Profile, Antonio Fuentes Trillanes IV
 supremecourt.gov.ph Trillanes v Pimentel, G.R. No. 179817, June 27, 2008

1971 births
Living people
Academic staff of Ateneo de Manila University
Bicolano politicians
De La Salle University alumni
Filipino YouTubers
Nacionalista Party politicians
People from Caloocan
Philippine Military Academy alumni
Philippine Navy personnel
Senators of the 14th Congress of the Philippines
Senators of the 15th Congress of the Philippines
Senators of the 16th Congress of the Philippines
Senators of the 17th Congress of the Philippines
United Opposition (Philippines) politicians
University of the Philippines Diliman alumni
Academic staff of the University of the Philippines
Candidates in the 2016 Philippine vice-presidential election